Unflesh is the second studio album by English electronic music project Gazelle Twin of composer, producer and musician Elizabeth Bernholz. It was released in the United Kingdom on 22 September 2014 to critical acclaim.

Production
Bernholz discussed developing the tracks: "Beats are the most instinctive thing to begin with as I get sense of something moving forward. I always find that a beat and a baseline work best to form the skeleton of a track, but sometimes it's good to shake things up and do it differently. I really like to loop found or homemade samples and hear melodies, or beats or harmonic overtones in those, and start building from there. Other times I'll start with a vocal line and build outwards."

Bernholz made Unflesh using the digital audio workstation Ableton. She wrote, recorded and produced all the material at home, and then went to MemeTune, an analogue studio in London, where she worked with Benge for additional production and mixing. All the tracks were mixed using a 1974 MCI console, Bernholz reasoning that "Anything sounds better through an analogue desk like that."

Composition
The writing process of Unflesh was simplified from Gazelle Twin's previous albums, resulting in a more direct and lo-fi sound and sharing only minimal connections with The Entire City. The record is more spoken word than melodic. Guy Mankowski described Unflesh lyrically as a "post-Kid A album, an extended critique of postmodern living". Euthanasia, miscarriage, European colonization, personal upbringing, and body dysmorphia are among the subjects present on the album.

The soundscapes were partly inspired by Bernholz' two-year study of science of medicine. In the words of Drowned in Sound writer Tristan Bath, instrumentation of "skittering beats" and "squeamishly thin synth tones" remain present throughout the album, with Bernholz' vocals "on top more often than not twisted unrecognisably into that of a demonic robot." Her voice changes constantly, writing that there are "several songs applying layer upon layer of densely mutated vocal tracks (as on the title track) while others remain clean in favour of the lyrics ('I Feel Blood')." The synths were noted to be influenced by Iggy Pop and John Carpenter. Artrocker's Finola Doran described the record as "like a piece of art rather than music one would sing and dance to", while in contrast, Robert Whitfield noted Unflesh to be "surprisingly danceable record amidst all the dark beats".

Critical reception

Unflesh was met with critical acclaim upon release, holding an aggregated 83 out of 100 from Metacritic based on eight reviews. It was named album of the year by The Quietus.

Accolades

Track listing

Personnel
Credits are adapted from the liner notes of Gazelle Twin's official bandcamp.

Musician
 Gazelle Twin – vocals

Technical personnel
 Gazelle Twin – production, recording, mixing
 Benge – additional production, mixing
 Shawn Joseph – mastering

Artwork
 Gazelle Twin – artwork
 Barnbrook – typography

References

2014 albums
Gazelle Twin albums